Balda is both a given name and a surname. Notable people with the name include:

Given name
Balda of Jouarre,  the third abbess at Jouarre Abbey in north-central France
Baldina Di Vittorio born Balda Di Vittorio, Italian politician

Surname
Antonín Balda, Czech weightlifter
Estefania Balda Álvarez, Ecuadorian professional tennis player
Kyle Balda (born 1971), American animator and film director
Fernando Balda,  Ecuadorian politician
Manu Balda, Ecuadorian footballer 
Russell Balda, American ornithologist
Lucio Ángel Vallejo Balda, Vatican monsignor associated with the Vatileaks  scandal
Mikel Loinaz Balda,  Spanish professional footballer